Ralph Waldo Emerson MacIvor (c. 1852 – 1 April 1917) was a United Kingdom agricultural chemist, active in Australia, New Zealand and Scotland.

MacIvor was educated in the United Kingdom, he became an Associate of the Institute of Chemistry in 1878 and a Fellow in 1883.

The Australian pastoralist William John Clarke paid MacIvor to lecture on agricultural chemistry in the colony of Victoria.

Publications
MacIvor, Ralph W. Emerson, The Chemistry of Agriculture, Stillwell, Melbourne, 1879, 275 pp
MacIvor, Ralph Waldo Emerson, 'MacIvor's Improved Method of Disposing of and Utilizing Night-soil, and Extracting therefrom, and Converting the Same into, Merchantable Commodities (Patent: 20 March 1886)', in Index to New South Wales Letters of Registration of Inventions, 1854 to July 1887, Government Printer, Sydney, 1891, p. 27.

References

Further reading

1852 births
1917 deaths
British agriculturalists